Maria del Carmen Rodriguez de Rivarola, better known by her artistic name Maria Rivarola (born in Buenos Aires, ca. 1957) is an outstanding professional dancer, social dancer, and choreographer of the Argentine Tango. She is known for performing a specific style of Argentine Tango known as Milonguero Tango. She is also known worldwide for being a cast member of the show Tango Argentino, released in 1983, which resulted in her nomination, along with the rest of the dancers, for the Tony Award in 1986 for Best Choreography. Since her youth, Carlos Rivarola has been her dance partner. Together, they present themselves artistically as Maria and Carlos Rivarola. Maria was one of the founders of the Association of Teachers, Dancers, and Choreographers of the Argentine Tango (ATDCAT) in 2001.

Biography 
Maria del Carmen Rodriguez was born in Buenos Aires around the year 1957. She has studied dance since her youth. During her teenage years, she took part in dances that were shown on television and in the theater, dancing mostly the flamenco.

After acting in many different Latin American countries, Maria returned to Argentina in the middle of the decade in 1970. It was then she came to know Carlos Rivarola, with whom she would be a dance and life partner, adapting from that point on the artistic name Maria Rivarola. Together, in 1975, they took part in a show, organized by Nelida and Nelson, which toured Peru, Colombia and Venezuela. In addition, they acted as one of the regular partners for the television program La Botica del Tango directed by Eduardo Bergara Leumann.

In 1983, they joined a cast that premiered in the hit show Tango Argentino, a theatrical dance production in which half of the thirty-five songs were choreographed, produced by Claudio Segovia and Hector Orezzoli, in Paris. The show, with its large movement quality, influenced a worldwide rebirth of the Tango, which allowed them to tour the world for a decade. Maria and Carlos were then nominated, along with the other dancers, for the Tony Award in 1986 for Best Choreography.

Starting in 1984, the couple began to travel to Japan every year, as they established a special artist connection there. In 1996, Carlos and Maria directed a show that they prepared for Japan entitled "Los Grandes del Tango Argentino". The show included the participation of Juan Carlos Copes, Maria Nieves, Nelida and Nelson, Mayoral and Elsa Maria, Carlos and Ines Borquez and the Color Tango Orchestra. Maria and Carlos also founded and maintained many tango clubs and academies in Japan located in Tokyo, Yokohama, Nagoya and Osaka.

Filmography 
Tango Bar (1989) de Marcos Zurinaga

See also 
 Argentine Tango

References

Sources 

 
 

1957 births
Living people
Tango dancers and choreographers
People from Buenos Aires
Argentine female dancers